The common fiscal has been split into two species:

 Northern fiscal, 	Lanius humeralis
 Southern fiscal, 	Lanius collaris

Birds by common name